T in the Park 2009 was the sixteenth T in the Park festival to take place since 1994. It took place on the weekend of Friday 10 July –  Sunday 12 July, at Balado, in Perth and Kinross, Scotland. Kings of Leon, Snow Patrol, Blur and The Killers headlined; 2009 was the first time the festival had seen four headliners.

As with the 2008 festival, the campsite officially opened on the Thursday evening to prevent traffic queues forming on the Friday.

Build Up 
The first batch of "early bird" tickets sold out in ten hours on 15 July 2008. On 27 February 2009, NME announced that camping tickets for the event had already sold out.

Festival organiser Geoff Ellis announced that the festival would feature more than 120 acts, playing to an audience of 85,000 people. On 31 January 2009, the first acts for the 2009 festival were confirmed as  Katy Perry and Bloc Party, with Kings of Leon and Snow Patrol confirmed as Friday and Sunday night headliners respectively. The Killers were confirmed to headline Saturday, with Blur announced to be joint-headliners of the final night. This marked the first time that the festival had been billed as having four headline bands.

The Festival

Inside the Arena 
The Main Stage, Radio 1/NME Stage, King Tut's Wah Wah Tent, Slam Tent and the T-Break Stage all returned for the festival. The Futures Stage also returned but was renamed to the Red Bull Bedroom Jam Futures Stage. The Pet Sounds Stage did not return. New to the festival was the BBC Introducing Stage, where relatively new and unsigned acts performed.

The Ceilidh Tent also returned, hosting traditional Scottish music, as did the Bacardi B-Live Tent featuring a cocktail bar and dance floor with electronic music.

Due to its popularity the previous year, the Healthy T arena was retained for the festival, hosting numerous stalls supplying nutritious and healthy food in comparison to the various fast food vans that operate throughout the main arena.

Performances 
The Horrors, who were due to play early on the Saturday, pulled out late due to one of the band's members falling ill.

On the Sunday, several of the earlier bands had to change their time slots by roughly an hour to cover the non-appearance of The Game. Ladyhawke also pulled out of her slot due to flu-like symptoms and was replaced by a second performance by Dundonian band The Law. The festival was put into further disarray in the evening with the possibility that Blur would pull out at the last minute due to guitarist Graham Coxon being apparently ill in hospital with food poisoning. Rumours circulating at the time suggested that the band had in fact fallen out before their set, but this was later denied. The festival times were pushed back by one and a half hours for Snow Patrol and Blur. It was announced by Blur once they had taken stage that their performance would be the last time they would play together and that this was the reason Coxon left the hospital to play.

Line-up

Main Stage

Radio 1 / NME Stage

King Tut's Tent

Slam Tent

Futures Stage

T Break Stage

BBC Introducing Stage

References 

2009 in Scotland
T in the Park
2009 in British music
July 2009 events in the United Kingdom
2009 music festivals